A clam garden (k’yuu kudhlk’aat’iija in the Haida language, lux̌ʷxiwēys in the Kwakʼwala language) is a traditional Indigenous management system used principally by Coast Salish peoples.  Clam gardens are a form of mariculture, where First Nations peoples created an optimal habitat for clams by modifying the beach.  These clam gardens are a food source for both First Nations peoples and animals.  They also provide food security as they are a food source that can be readily harvested year-round.

Clam gardens are found along the west coast of North America.  Over 2,000 clam gardens have been identified on the coast of Alaska, British Columbia, Washington and California.  Though most clam gardens are currently untended, restoration of sections of previously untended clam gardens are occurring in Fulford Harbour on Salt Spring Island and on Russell Island located in the Gulf Islands National Park Reserve.

Composition

Boulder wall 
Once a location was chosen by an individual or a group of First Nations peoples, clam garden construction began with the creation of a boulder or rock wall along the shoreline of a beach.  Strong individuals would roll large boulders down to the lowest tideline on the beach, thus creating a rock wall.  The rising tide brings sediment over the rock walls, where it accumulates and creates an extended soft sediment beach area, creating ideal clam habitat.  The rock wall is low enough that it allows the clam garden to be submerged at high tide, but tall enough that the beach is exposed for harvesting during low tide.

Due to weather and the movement of tides, rock walls require continual maintenance.  Historically, clam gardens were regularly tended to by First Nations individuals who moved rocks from inside the clam gardens onto the rock wall.  Both archeological evidence and traditional knowledge assert that boulder walls were built up over time and continually maintained.  New rocks were regularly added to the top of the boulder wall when First Nations peoples harvested the clam beds.

Sediment 
The accumulation of sediment trapped by the boulder wall creates a flatter beach, which is an optimal growing habitat for clams.  This sediment has an optimal density for clam growth, free from fine clay and silt particles that are washed away by the high tide.

The density of the sediment was also due to the process of aerating the sand while clams were harvested. Many clam gardens also have a high amount of gravel and shell hash, which aid in aerating the sand.  This density allows for freer movement of clams, in addition to easier removal of clams from the sediment.

Animals 
Clam gardens are an ideal habitat for many animals.  The modified beach attracts growth of many clams, notably: butter, littleneck, cockle and horse clams.  Animals such as barnacles, chiton, snails, crabs, eels, mussels, octopus, urchin, and sea cucumbers also live in clam gardens. Other animals such as ghost shrimp and worms are found buried in the loose sediment.

Usage

Food source 
Clam gardens were a food source for many Coast Salish peoples, and provided food security to many diverse First Nation communities. This was due to the abundance of clams that could be easily harvested and were readily accessible. Women and children were the primary group tasked with harvesting clams at low tide, though everyone in the community could participate. Once harvested, families could consume the clams immediately or smoke them to be preserved for the winter.  Resources of clams, either smoked or harvested from the gardens were important since they served as sustenance when other foods were scarce. Some nations, such as the Kwakwaka’wakw nation, traditionally harvested clams from October to early March so as to avoid the red tide.

Clam gardens were not exclusive to humans but also served as a protein-rich food source for animals, such as bears, during the spring or summer.  Animals such as raccoons, mink, river otters, bears, sea ducks, and geese also feed in clam gardens.

Knowledge transmission 
Traditional clam harvesting also allowed for intergenerational knowledge transmission, with Elders passing down knowledge about clam gardens to the next generation.  Clam gardens were similar to an outdoor classroom, where traditional knowledge, language and cultural practices could be learned by the community.

Ownership 
Each Nation has specific protocols and governance systems around land management, and many access areas are family-based.  For clam gardens, families often asserted ownership by regularly tending to the beach and maintaining the rock wall.  These clam gardens were stewarded for the next generation.  Historically, unmanaged clam gardens could be harvested by anyone in the community.  Families could claim ownership by building their own clam garden on an undeveloped beach area in their traditional territory.

Historical age  
The exact age of the origin of clam gardening is unknown.  In present day, scholars argue that accurately dating clam gardens is difficult due to the rock wall being submerged, in addition to rising sea levels.

Archeologists are studying the ages of clam gardens using methods such as optically stimulated luminescence and radiocarbon dating on the rock wall.  Scholars are using both methods to gain a better understanding of the age of clam gardens. The results are different depending on the sample as evidence suggests walls were built up by communities over time.  Dating results suggest that clam gardens range from 1000 to 1700 years old, whereas other samples indicate that they date back to 3000-3500 years.

Conversely, many First Nations peoples have a different perspective of clam garden creation.  For example, Clan Chief Adam Dick, Kwaxsistalla of the Kwakwaka'wakw nation, states that clam gardens have been around “since the beginning of time.” Tom Sewid, a Native Watchman of the Mamalilikulla-Qwe'Qwa'Sot'Em nation, states that his ancestors have maintained clam gardens over "thousands of years" citing clam gardens as title to his traditional lands.

Restoration 
Today, the interdisciplinary and collaborative research group "The Clam Garden Network" is actively involved in continuously furthering the research about traditional clam garden management.

In 2014, restoration work began to revive two clam gardens in the Gulf Islands National Park Reserve in a project between Parks Canada and the Hul'q'umi'num and Saanich nations.

The Swinomish Tribe of Washington built a new clam garden on Kiket Island in 2022. It is believed to be the first clam garden built in the United States in over 200 years.

References 

Clams
Aquaculture
Coast Salish
Seafood in Native American cuisine
Indigenous cuisine in Canada
Ethnobiology